Poe Dameron is a fictional character in the Star Wars franchise. Introduced in the 2015 film Star Wars: The Force Awakens, he is portrayed by Oscar Isaac. Poe is an X-wing fighter pilot for the Resistance who inadvertently brings renegade stormtrooper Finn (John Boyega) and Jakku scavenger Rey (Daisy Ridley) into battle against the sinister First Order. The character is featured in The Force Awakens media and merchandising as well as an eponymous comic book series. He returns in the film's sequels The Last Jedi (2017) and The Rise of Skywalker (2019), the Disney XD animated series Star Wars Resistance (2018–2020) and the Disney+ television specials The Lego Star Wars Holiday Special (2020) and Terrifying Tales (2021).

Isaac's performance and the character have received positive reviews, with Poe's characterization being compared to that of Han Solo (Harrison Ford) in the original Star Wars film trilogy.

Character

Concept
During the development phase of The Force Awakens, the character was initially referred to as "John Doe" and was first intended to be Jedi-like, Wedge Antilles, and then a bounty hunter with a Wookiee sidekick. This was dropped and Han Solo and Chewbacca were then included in the story.

When Oscar Isaac was offered the role, Poe was supposed to die early in The Force Awakens. When Isaac accepted the role, writer/director J. J. Abrams said he had changed his mind, stating, "I've figured it out. You're in the whole movie now."

Portrayal
Isaac's casting in the film was first announced on April 29, 2014. His character was first seen in the 88-second The Force Awakens teaser trailer released by Lucasfilm on November 28, 2014, piloting an X-wing fighter. The name Poe Dameron was revealed by Entertainment Weekly in a Lucasfilm-designed Topps-style trading card mockup in December 2014. The character was one of those featured in a May 2015 Vanity Fair photo shoot by Annie Leibovitz. He was named after  J. J. Abrams' assistant Morgan Dameron, who later went on to direct her own feature films. Comedic lines of Poe's in The Force Awakens (like those during his interrogation by Kylo Ren) were added in reshoots, and some were improvised by Isaac.

The film has received praise for its diverse casting, including Isaac, who is Guatemalan-American. Peter Travers of Rolling Stone wrote that "giving starring roles to a black man, a white woman and a Latino is ... quietly history making". Targeted at Spanish-speaking viewers, an action-oriented Univision TV spot heavily featuring Poe included an introduction by Isaac in Spanish. After an initial release of promotional character posters in November 2015, a poster featuring Isaac's Poe was released the following month.

Description
In The Force Awakens, Poe is a skilled X-wing fighter pilot for the Resistance. The son of Rebel Alliance fighters, he is a commander in the Resistance's Starfighter Corps and "one of Leia Organa's most-trusted operatives" who is headstrong and "can fly anything". Isaac described Poe as "the best freaking pilot in the galaxy... He's been sent on a mission by a certain princess, and he ends up coming up across [Finn], and their fates are forever intertwined."

Natalie Zutter and Chris Lough of Tor.com wrote, "Poe is that rare creature who knows exactly what he wants to do with his life." Isaac said of the character in 2015, "Poe's the kind of guy you want in the trenches with you. He’s straightforward, he’s honest, he's incredibly loyal and he’s got some swagger to him." Katy Waldman wrote for Slate, "This is Poe Dameron, star pilot, heartthrob, wiseass, ace leather jacket–bestower, Finn’s OTP. When he grins up at [Kylo Ren], all rakish charm and derring-do, we know the movie will be OK." Comic book writer Charles Soule, creator of the 2015 Marvel Comics series Star Wars: Poe Dameron, said of the character, "I think it's his charisma that really defines him, for me. Poe Dameron is one charming fellow. We've seen great pilots before, and great warriors, but his ability to lead and inspire feels pretty fresh to me, as is his somewhat snappy roguishness." Alex Segura, author of Star Wars Poe Dameron: Free Fall, said of Poe, "I love the complexities of the character—he's charming, a bit of a scoundrel, not afraid to bend the rules—but he's also driven by loyalty and legacy, and friendship. He's a hero, but in a world where there is absolute good and absolute evil, Poe is a bit gray." Addressing Poe's early life as explored in Free Fall, Segura said:

After filming The Last Jedi but before its release, Isaac said in 2017:

Appearances

Films

The Force Awakens (2015)
In Star Wars: The Force Awakens (2015), Poe Dameron is the decorated star pilot of General Leia Organa's (Carrie Fisher) Resistance fleet, and the robot BB-8 is his astromech droid. He is sent by Leia on a mission to the planet Jakku to retrieve part of a map that will lead to the location of her brother, Luke Skywalker (Mark Hamill). Before Poe can leave with the map, the First Order attacks and he is captured. The pilot has entrusted the map to BB-8, who flees into the desert as Kylo Ren (Adam Driver) tortures Poe in search of the map. Poe is saved by the renegade stormtrooper Finn (John Boyega), and they escape in a TIE fighter. They crash on Jakku; Finn is ejected from the ship and Poe is presumed dead as the destroyed craft is sucked under the sand. Poe later reappears, having also been thrown from the crash, now leading a squadron of X-wing pilots in an assault on the First Order at Maz Kanata's (Lupita Nyong’o) castle. He later leads his squadron to attack the First Order's Starkiller Base, and personally fires the shots that cause the superweapon to explode.

The 2015 novelization of The Force Awakens by Alan Dean Foster explains that Poe regains consciousness and is able to crash land the TIE fighter in the desert. Thrown from the wreckage, he comes upon the Blarina scavenger Naka Iit. Poe helps Naka outrun a team of pirates, and in turn Naka helps Poe get to Blowback Town.

The Last Jedi (2017)
In Star Wars: The Last Jedi (2017), shortly after the destruction of Starkiller Base, the Resistance evacuates their base on D'Qar as the First Order closes in. Poe leads a counterattack on the First Order to give the last Resistance fighters more time board the transports. When they do so, Leia orders Poe to pull back, but he insists that they seize the opportunity to destroy one of the First Order's Dreadnoughts, and calls in a team of bombers. While they are successful in taking out the ship, all of the bombers are destroyed and their crews killed, and Leia demotes Poe to captain for his recklessness and unwillingness to follow orders. The First Order soon attacks again, having tracked the Resistance through lightspeed, a feat previously believed to have been impossible. The attack claims the lives of nearly all of the Resistance's leadership and renders Leia unconscious. While Poe assumes that he will become the acting general, Leia is instead replaced by Vice Admiral Holdo (Laura Dern), who dismisses his suggestions due to his earlier reckless actions. Poe concocts a plan with Finn and mechanic Rose Tico (Kelly Marie Tran) to disable the First Order's tracker from within their lead Star Destroyer, but keeps the operation a secret from Holdo. Discovering that Holdo's plan is to have the Resistance forces abandon their vulnerable cruiser, Poe stages a mutiny. Finn, Rose, and BB-8 fail to disable the tracker, and an awakened Leia stops Poe's mutiny and resumes command though both Leia and Holdo express respect for Poe's daring. Leia later reveals to Poe that Holdo's plan was always to use the cruiser to draw the First Order off while the transports escaped undetected. The transports take the Resistance forces to an abandoned base on the planet Crait, where they transmit a distress signal to their allies. Poe leads an offensive against the invading First Order, but is unable to stop their assault. As Luke faces off against Ren, Poe leads the remaining members of the Resistance to escape through an uncharted passage. He is among those who flee with Rey (Daisy Ridley) on the Millennium Falcon.

In an early version of the script, Poe accompanies Finn to Canto Bight, but writer/director Rian Johnson found the storyline flat when he realized their dialogue was interchangeable. This led to the creation of the character Rose Tico, who would challenge and contrast with Finn.

The Rise of Skywalker (2019)
In Star Wars: The Rise of Skywalker (2019), one year later, Poe, along with Finn and Chewbacca (Joonas Suotamo), go to retrieve information about Kylo Ren from a First Order mole. He then goes to Passanna with Rey, Finn, BB-8, Chewbacca, and C-3PO (Anthony Daniels) to meet with one of Luke's contacts, purported to know about a Sith dagger that is connected to the resurrection of Emperor Palpatine (Ian McDiarmid), revealed to be the real power behind the First Order. This contact turns out to be Lando Calrissian (Billy Dee Williams), who along with the group is located and chased by the First Order, only just managing to evade them. After Chewbacca's apparent death, they head to Kijimi and meet up with Zorii Bliss (Keri Russell), a former crew member who helps them reach a black market droidsmith who will assist them in translating the language on the Sith dagger. They get help from Babu Frik (Shirley Henderson) to help C-3PO translate the language, but at the cost of his memories.

On Kijimi, Poe's backstory is explored: Zorii reveals that he used to be a spice runner and abandoned his friends and crew when he decided to fly for the Resistance. Zorii still maintains much resentment toward Poe for having left and nearly kills him upon meeting him again in Kijimi, but decides to help when Rey defeats her in combat. Zorii, reconnecting with Poe, tells him that she plans to travel the galaxy, and invites Poe to join her. Poe, whose faith in the Resistance has been shaken by the lack of support they have received since the Battle of Crait, considers going along with her, but Zorii ultimately urges him to finish what the Resistance has started. She helps him to board the Resurgent-class Star Destroyer Steadfast to rescue Chewbacca, whom he learns is still alive. While attempting to rescue Chewbacca, Poe and Finn are captured and set to be executed by General Hux (Domnhall Gleeson); Hux, however, lets them go when he reveals that he is the mole, supporting their cause to undermine Ren. They subsequently rescue Rey and Chewbacca aboard the Millennium Falcon and leave for Kef Bir, the ocean moon of Endor, where the remains of the second Death Star lie. While there, Poe displays a lack of concern for Rey's wellbeing, prompting Finn to reprimand him for his poor leadership skills in comparison to Leia.

Rey leaves Endor following her confrontation with Ren, leaving Poe, Finn, and new ally Jannah (Naomi Ackie) to return to the Resistance base. There, they learn that Leia has died, having made Poe Acting General before becoming one with the Force. Poe is deeply shaken and nervous about the pressure of leading the Resistance, but receives guidance from Lando, who shares that he was able to survive because of his reliance on his friends. Poe makes Finn his co-general and, upon learning the location of Exegol, gives a rousing speech to the rest of the Resistance that they have a cause that the rest of the galaxy believes in, and that good people will fight as long as they are able to lead them. Asking Lando to recruit Resistance allies throughout the galaxy, Poe leads a major strike against the Sith Eternal forces, including the Final Order. Despite the initial successes of the attack, the Sith Eternal seems to be more than the Resistance can take and, upon the death of Poe's friend Snap Wexley  (Greg Grunberg), Poe begins to believe that his efforts have been futile. However, Lando soon arrives with a major fleet of supporters throughout the galaxy, including Zorii and Wedge Antilles (Denis Lawson). With the help of these supporters, as well as the deaths of Ren and Palpatine, the Resistance is able to secure their victory against the remaining Sith forces. Back at the Resistance base, Poe shares a final moment with Zorii, and reunites with Finn and Rey in an emotional victory celebration.

The Lego Star Wars Holiday Special (2020)
In The Lego Star Wars Holiday Special (2020), the following Life Day, Poe arranges a party to celebrate with Finn, Max Rebo, and Chewbacca's family, oblivious to Rey's travels through time.

Lego Star Wars: Terrifying Tales (2021)
In Lego Star Wars: Terrifying Tales (2021), some time later, Poe and BB-8 make an emergency landing to repair their damaged X-wing fighter on Mustafar. While waiting for it to be repaired, the duo encounter crime boss Graballa the Hutt, who is renovating the former castle of Darth Vader as a hotel intended for tourism. Embarking on a tour with Graballa, BB-8, and Graballa's young mechanic Dean, Poe listens to the castle's caretaker — Vaneé, a former servant of Vader's — as they tell three wildly inaccurate accounts of Star Wars history about the various artefacts present in the castle. After finishing telling Poe and the others the stories, Vaneé tricks Dean — revealed to be Force-sensitive — into opening a Sith holocron for him, before donning Sith armour and the helmet of the Knights of Ren founder Ren and using the holocron to give himself artificial Force sensitivity. While attempting to kill them and leave the castle, Vaneé is knocked into lava by Poe and Dean — impressed by Dean's abilities, Poe offers to bring him to Rey for her to train him as a Jedi, and leaves in the X-wing with BB-8 and Dean, newly repaired by Dean.

Literature

Poe also appears in multiple Star Wars novels and comic books, in particular the Journey to Star Wars line, introduced to connect the Star Wars sequel trilogy with previous film installments.

Novels
Poe is first mentioned in the young adult novel Moving Target: A Princess Leia Adventure (2015) by Cecil Castellucci and Jason Fry, set between The Empire Strikes Back (1980) and Return of the Jedi (1983). Poe is featured in Star Wars: Before the Awakening (2015) by Greg Rucka, an anthology book for young readers about the lives of Poe, Rey and Finn before the events of The Force Awakens. Star Wars: Resistance Reborn (2019) by Rebecca Roanhorse, covers the rebuilding of the Resistance after the events of The Last Jedi. Star Wars: Poe Dameron: Free Fall by Alex Segura, released on August 4, 2020, explores Poe's early life and connection to Zorii Bliss. 

Poe also features prominently in the novelizations of the sequel trilogy films.

Comics
Yavin 4, the moon on which the Rebel base was located in the 1977 film Star Wars, was established as Poe's homeworld in the comic series Star Wars: Shattered Empire (2015) after the Guatemalan-born Isaac learned that the shooting location for Yavin 4 had been Tikal, Guatemala. The Shattered Empire series features Poe's parents, members of the Rebel Alliance: his mother is Shara Bey, an A-wing pilot who adventures with Leia, and his father is Kes Dameron, part of a special ground force known as the Pathfinders who are led by Han Solo. 

A Marvel comic book series titled Star Wars: Poe Dameron, written by Charles Soule and illustrated by Phil Noto, was published between April 2016 and September 2018. The beginning of the series takes place shortly before The Force Awakens, eventually crossing over with that film's events and going past those of The Last Jedi.

Television 
Poe appears in the 2018 animated TV series Star Wars Resistance, voiced by Isaac. The Lego versions of Poe and BB-8 also appear in the 2016 short form animated series Lego Star Wars: The Resistance Rises, voiced by Lex Lang, and the short Poe Dameron vs the First Order Snowspeeder.

Video games
Poe is a playable character in the 2015 Force Awakens add-on to the Disney Infinity 3.0 video game, with an Infinity character figurine available separately. He is also a playable character in the video games Star Wars: Galaxy of Heroes (2015), Lego Star Wars: The Force Awakens (2016) and Star Wars: Force Arena (2017).  He was also planned to appear in the cancelled mobile game Star Wars: Rivals.  His personal X-Wing starfighter is playable in Star Wars: Battlefront II, the sequel to its 2015 reboot.

Merchandising
Hasbro has released a 3.75 inch Poe Dameron action figure, and a 6-inch figure in their Black Series line. Funko has produced three Poe Dameron figures as part of their POP! Television line of 4.5 inch vinyl figures in the Japanese super deformed style. The first features the character in his flight suit, helmet, and goggles; the second is a Hot Topic-exclusive version in Poe's leather jacket look from the beginning of the film; and a third is an f.y.e.-exclusive version in an orange First Order "prisoner suit" and facial cut. Poe and BB-8 are featured in a Lego Star Wars playset called Poe's X-wing Fighter, and Poe is available as a Lego Buildable Figure. Hasbro released a wearable replica of Poe's helmet as part of its Star Wars: The Black Series line in 2017.

Theme parks 
Poe Dameron appears in the theme park attractions Star Tours – The Adventures Continue and Star Wars: Rise of the Resistance, with Isaac reprising the role in each instance.

Reception
The character and Isaac's portrayal have received positive reviews. Michael Phillips of the Chicago Tribune wrote, "Oscar Isaac is a primary asset as Poe Dameron ... Like Ford's Han Solo in the original three, he's the guy you want on your team, the one who doesn't take any guff". Robbie Collin of The Telegraph called Poe "a dashing, dry-humoured swashbuckler—in short, he’s like Han Solo was 40 years ago". Todd McCarthy of The Hollywood Reporter described the "hotshot" pilot as "a man very much in the Solo mold", and Manohla Dargis of The New York Times wrote that Poe "suggests a next-generation Han". Richard Roeper of the Chicago Sun-Times noted that "Isaac has more than a bit of Han Solo swagger", and Ann Hornaday of The Washington Post said that "Isaac brings just the right amount of cocksure street smarts to his role". Brian Hiatt of Rolling Stone wrote that Poe's "loose, jazzy dialogue was the first, highly welcome clue that these new films would be more human in tone than George Lucas' prequels." The Telegraph also listed Poe's scenes as one of their "14 things Star Wars fans will love about The Force Awakens", writing that they "spark and fizz with energy" and that "while Han Solo will always hold the number one spot, Oscar Isaac’s Poe Dameron is definitely a serious contender for the title of Second Coolest Man in the Galaxy". Peter Travers of Rolling Stone wrote that "Isaac oozes flyboy charm". Alex Brown of Tor.com called Poe "the greatest addition to Star Wars canon since Mara Jade", a popular character from the Star Wars expanded universe. Some critics believed that the revelation in The Rise of Skywalker that Poe spent time as a spice smuggler in his youth did not fit with what audiences already knew about the character from his film, television, novel, and comics appearances.

Both Joanna Robinson of Vanity Fair and Scott Mendelson of Forbes noted the chemistry between Poe and Finn (John Boyega), with Brian Truitt of USA Today calling the relationship a "bromance". Their scenes in the film, and Isaac's own comments during an interview with Ellen DeGeneres, have sparked fan and journalistic speculation that Poe could be gay, or be developed as such in future films. Several media outlets reported the wave of fan fiction and fan art created by fan "shippers", or those with a desire to see Poe and Finn in a romantic relationship. Commenting on Isaac's camaraderie with his The Force Awakens cast members, Robinson wrote that "the most important bond Isaac established was with John Boyega. Theirs is a flirtation that launched a thousand pieces of fan fiction." Despite fan support and Isaac's push for a romantic relationship between the characters, such a direction was not pursued in The Rise of Skywalker. Film editor Maryann Brandon, who worked on both The Force Awakens and The Rise of Skywalker, said she did not see a romance develop between the two characters in the footage for the films, noting that she was "not reading as much into it as an audience." Brandon described the characters as the "best of friends. There is a kind of brotherhood there where they understand each other, and they've got each other's back."

References

External links
 
 
 Poe Dameron on IMDb

Film characters introduced in 2015
Fictional fighter pilots
Fictional commanders
Fictional marksmen and snipers
Fictional military captains
Fictional military personnel in films
Fictional war veterans
Star Wars Skywalker Saga characters
Star Wars Resistance characters
Fictional revolutionaries
Male characters in film
Fictional space pilots